The Piano Quintet No. 2 in E major, Op. 31, was composed by the French composer Louise Farrenc in 1840.

Instrumentation
This work is scored for piano, violin, viola, cello & double bass.

Movements
This piece adheres to the standard 4-movement form: 
Andante sostenuto - Allegro grazioso (in E major and in sonata form)
Grave (in A major and in sonata rondo form)
Scherzo (Vivace) (in C-sharp minor and in ternary form, with a "trio" section in D-flat major)
Finale (Allegro) (in E major and in sonata form) - unusually, the second subject in the exposition is in A-flat major

See also
Piano Quintet No. 1 (Farrenc)

References

External links

Farrenc
Compositions in E major
1840 compositions
Compositions by Louise Farrenc